The R387 is a Regional Route in South Africa that connects the N12 near Strydenburg with the R369 near Orania.

External links
 Routes Travel Info

References

Regional Routes in the Northern Cape